Lysinibacillus  is a genus of bacteria from the family of Bacillaceae. Members of this genus, in contrast to the type species of the genus Bacillus, contains peptidoglycan with lysine, aspartic acid, alanine and glutamic acid.

References

Bacillaceae
Bacteria genera